Tegda (Teegde) is a rural locality (a selo) in Khorinsky District, Republic of Buryatia, Russia. The population was 1,756 as of 2010. There are 29 streets.

References 

Rural localities in Khorinsky District